Robert Cornelius Murphy (born July 19, 1988) is a Filipino-American Internet entrepreneur and software engineer. He is the co-founder and the CTO of the American multinational technology and social media company Snap Inc., which he created (as Snapchat Inc.) with Evan Spiegel and Reggie Brown while they were students at Stanford University.

He was named as one of "100 Most Influential People in 2014" by Time. In 2015, Murphy was first listed and became the second-youngest billionaire in the world by Forbes.

Early life 
Murphy was born on July 19, 1988, in Berkeley, California. His mother grew up in the Philippines, and emigrated to the United States.

Murphy grew up in Berkeley, California and was educated at the School of the Madeleine, a private Roman Catholic grade school there. He received his secondary education at Saint Mary's College High School, also a private Catholic high school in Berkeley.

Education 
Murphy graduated in 2010 from Stanford University in Stanford, California, where he received a Bachelor of Science degree in mathematical and computational science. He was also a member of the Kappa Sigma fraternity along with Evan Spiegel and Reggie Brown.

==Career==
Murphy was recruited by Spiegel after they finished working on a failed startup called Future Freshman, a website that helped high school kids get advice when applying to colleges. In 2011, Murphy co-founded a disappearing-image messaging app called Picaboo. The name was later changed to Snapchat. After graduating from Stanford, Murphy spent a year working as a software engineer at Revel Systems (an iPad point of sale system for restaurants). Until Snapchat could secure venture capital funding, he used half of his paycheck to cover the cost of Snapchat's server bills.

At Snapchat, Murphy has led the engineering and research teams. Murphy has also worked with Snapchat's Snap Labs team, which produced Spectacles camera glasses in 2018. At the time of Snapchat's IPO in 2017, Murphy and Spiegel held over 45% of the company's total stock. They also held over 70% of the voting power.

In February 2017, Murphy and Spiegel pledged to donate up to 13,000,000 shares of Class A common stock to their newly created Snap Foundation, which will support the arts, education and youth non-profits, over the course of 15–20 years.

Personal life 
Murphy is a native of California. In 2015, he was recorded as the 1,250th-richest person in the world, by Forbes Magazine. In 2015, Murphy ranked as the #15 U.S. Richest Entrepreneurs Under 40. As of 2016, he was ranked #374 on the Forbes 400. In 2018, Murphy purchased the former Pacific Palisades estate of "Green Acres" actor Eddie Albert for the asking price of $19.5 million. In 2021, he purchased a property on the Manhattan Beach Strand for $14.5 million.

References 

1988 births
Living people
American technology company founders
American billionaires
American people of Filipino descent
Businesspeople from Los Angeles
People from Berkeley, California
People from Venice, Los Angeles
Stanford University alumni
21st-century American businesspeople